Maestrale was the lead ship of her class of four destroyers built for the  (Royal Italian Navy) in the early 1930s. Completed in 1934, she served in World War II.

Design and description
The Maestrale-class destroyers were a completely new design intended to rectify the stability problems of the preceding . Their complement during wartime was 190 officers and enlisted men.

The Maestrales were powered by two Parsons geared steam turbines, each driving one propeller shaft using steam supplied by a trio of three-drum boilers.

Their main battery consisted of four  guns in two twin-gun turrets, one each fore and aft of the superstructure. Amidships were a pair of 15-caliber 120-millimeter star shell guns. Anti-aircraft (AA) defense for the Maestrale-class ships was provided by four  machine guns. They were equipped with six  torpedo tubes in two triple mounts amidships. Although the ships were not provided with a sonar system for anti-submarine work, they were fitted with a pair of depth charge throwers. The Maestrales could carry 56 mines.

Citations

Bibliography

External links

 Maestrale Marina Militare website

Maestrale-class destroyers
1934 ships
World War II destroyers of Italy
Maritime incidents in September 1943